The 2010–11 Western Carolina Catamounts men's basketball team represented Western Carolina University during the 2010–11 college basketball season. This was head coach Larry Hunter's sixth season at Western Carolina. The Catamounts competed in the Southern Conference and played their home games at the Ramsey Center.

Schedule and results

|-
!colspan=9 style=|Regular season

|-
!colspan=9 style=| Southern Conference Tournament

References

Western Carolina
Western Carolina Catamounts men's basketball seasons
Western Carolina
Western Carolina